George Ferguson may refer to:

George Ferguson (colonial administrator) (1748–1820), 4th Laird of Pitfour
George Ferguson (Royal Navy officer) (1788–1867), Scottish admiral and Member of Parliament
G. E. Ferguson (1864–1897), Fante government official in the British colony Gold Coast
George Howard Ferguson (1870–1946), Canadian politician
George Ferguson (baseball) (1883–1943), American baseball player
George Ferguson (actor) (1890–1961), American stage and silent film actor
George Ferguson (cricketer) (1912–1995), cricketer who played for Argentina
George Ferguson (politician) (born 1947), British architect and first elected mayor of Bristol
George Ferguson (ice hockey) (1952–2019), Canadian ice hockey player
George Ferguson (footballer, fl. 1946–54), Scottish footballer
George Ferguson (footballer, born 1872) (1872–1898), Scottish footballer

See also
George Fergusson (disambiguation)